The 2017–18 Bethune–Cookman Wildcats men's basketball team represented Bethune-Cookman University during the 2017–18 NCAA Division I men's basketball season. The Wildcats, led by first-year head coach Ryan Ridder, played their home games at the Moore Gymnasium in Daytona Beach, Florida as members of the Mid-Eastern Athletic Conference. With a win over Florida A&M on March 1, 2018, the Wildcats earned a share of the MEAC regular season championship. They finished the season 18–14, 2–4 in MEAC play, finishing in a three-way tie for first. Due to tie-breaking procedures, they received the No. 2 seed in the MEAC tournament, where they lost to Morgan State in the quarterfinals.

Previous season
The Wildcats finished the 2016–17 season 10–22, 6–10 in MEAC play to finish in tenth place. They defeated Delaware State before losing in the quarterfinals of the MEAC tournament to North Carolina Central.

On March 20, 2017, it was announced that head coach Gravelle Craig's contract would not be renewed. He finished at Bethune–Cookman with a six-year record of 74–123. The Wildcats hired Ryan Ridder from Daytona State of the NJCAA as the new head coach on March 31.

Roster

Schedule and results

|-
!colspan=9 style=| Regular season

|-
!colspan=9 style=| MEAC tournament

References

Bethune–Cookman Wildcats men's basketball seasons
Bethune-Cookman